Mycoskie is a surname. Notable people with the surname include: 

Blake Mycoskie (born 1976), American businessman
Paige Mycoskie (born 1980), American artist, fashion designer, and businesswoman